Matthew Abela (born 18 March 1999) is a Maltese badminton player affiliated with Paola badminton club. He competed at the 2020 Summer Olympics in Men's singles.

He is seven times Maltese National champion.

Career 
Abela started playing badminton when he was 5 years old and his father, who is a coach, used to bring him to training sessions. He trained at the Paola badminton club, and entered the Maltese national team since 2011. He won his first U19 national junior title in 2011, and until 2019, he has collected eleven U19 national junior titles. He made his international debut in the junior tournament in 2013, and to improve and reach his future goals to become a better badminton player, he joining Badminton Europe's Centre of Excellence based in Holbæk, Denmark in September 2017.

Abela won six men's singles title and one mixed doubles title at the Maltese National Championships. With participation at 2020 Tokyo Olympics confirmed, Abela has also been confirmed as the first badminton player to ever represent Malta at the Olympics.

Personal life 
Abela is a fan of Liverpool F.C. and has stated his favourite ever player is Steven Gerrard.

References

External links 
 

1999 births
Living people
People from Pietà, Malta
Maltese male badminton players
Badminton players at the 2020 Summer Olympics
Olympic badminton players of Malta
Badminton players at the 2022 Commonwealth Games
Commonwealth Games competitors for Malta